The following is an alphabetical list of topics related to the Republic of Palau.

0–9

.pw – Internet country code top-level domain for Palau

A
Aimeliik
Air Force of Palau
Airai
Airports in Palau
Angaur
Army of Palau
Atlas of Palau

B
Babeldaob
Baseball in Palau
BentProp Project
Birds of Palau
Bkulangriil

C
Capital of Palau:  Melekeok
Caroline Islands
Categories:
:Category:Palau
:Category:Buildings and structures in Palau
:Category:Communications in Palau
:Category:Economy of Palau
:Category:Education in Palau
:Category:Environment of Palau
:Category:Geography of Palau
:Category:Government of Palau
:Category:History of Palau
:Category:Military of Palau
:Category:Palauan culture
:Category:Palauan people

:Category:Palau-related lists
:Category:Politics of Palau
:Category:Society of Palau
:Category:Sport in Palau
:Category:Transport in Palau
commons:Category:Palau
Chelbacheb
Cities in Palau
Climate of Palau
Coat of arms of Palau
Communications in Palau
Compact of Free Association with the United States of America
Cuisine of Palau

D
Demographics of Palau
Yukiwo P. Dengokl
Diplomatic missions in Palau
Diplomatic missions of Palau

E
Eastern Hemisphere
Ecology of Palau
Economy of Palau
Education in Palau
Elections in Palau
English language
Environment of Palau

F

Flag of Koror
Flag of Palau
Foreign relations of Palau

G
Geography of Palau
Government of Palau
Gross domestic product

H
Hatohobei
Health care in Palau
History of Palau

I
Imeong Conservation Area
Imetang
International Organization for Standardization (ISO)
ISO 3166-1 alpha-2 country code for the Republic of Palau: PW
ISO 3166-1 alpha-3 country code for the Republic of Palau: PLW
ISO 3166-2:PW region codes for the Republic of Palau
Internet in Palau
Island countries

J

Jellyfish Lake

K
Kayangel
Koror

L
Law enforcement in Palau
Lists:
Diplomatic missions of Palau
List of airports in Palau
List of archipelagos
List of beaches in Palau
List of birds of Palau
List of cities in Palau
List of countries by GDP (nominal)
List of diplomatic missions in Palau
List of island countries
List of island countries by area
List of island countries by population density
List of Palau-related topics
List of Palauans
List of political parties in Palau
List of radio stations in Palau
List of wettest tropical cyclones to affect Palau

M
Melanesia
Melekeok, capital
Micronesia
Micronesia challenge
Military of Palau
Music of Palau

N
Nesopupa eapensis
Ngaraard
Ngarchelong
Ngardmau
Ngaremlengui
Ngatpang
Ngchesar
Ngetbong
Ngiwal
Ngkeklau
North Pacific Ocean
Northern Hemisphere

O
Oceania
Ollei

P
Pacific Ocean
Palau
Palau at the Olympics
Palau Community College
Palau International Airport
Palau Islands
Palauan language
Peleliu
PLW – ISO 3166-1 alpha-3 country code for the Republic of Palau
Political parties in Palau
Politics of Palau
President of Palau
Prominent Palauans
Public holidays in Palau
PW – ISO 3166-1 alpha-2 and USPS country code for the Republic of Palau

Q

R
Radio stations in Palau
Leilani Reklai
Religion in Palau
Republic of Palau
Rock Islands (Palau)

S
Scouting in Palau
Senate of Palau
Small Island Developing States
Sonsorol
Southwest Islands (Palau)
States of Palau:
Aimeliik
Airai
Angaur
Hatohobei
Kayangel
Koror
Melekeok
Ngaraard
Ngarchelong
Ngardmau
Ngaremlengui
Ngatpang
Ngchesar
Ngiwal
Peleliu
Sonsorol
Supreme Court of Palau

T
Topic outline of Palau
Transport in Palau
Tropical cyclones in Palau
Trust Territory of the Pacific Islands

U 
United States-Palau relations

V

W

Wikipedia:WikiProject Topic outline/Drafts/Topic outline of Palau

X

Y

Z

See also

List of international rankings
Lists of country-related topics
Topic outline of geography
Topic outline of Palau

External links

 
Palau